Below is a list of notable men's and women's artistic gymnastics international events scheduled to be held in 2020, as well as the medalists.

Calendar of events

Events canceled or postponed
Due to the COVID-19 pandemic, several events were canceled or postponed.

Medalists

Women

Regional championships

World Cup series

Men

Regional championships

World Cup series

Season's best international scores
Note: Only the scores of senior gymnasts from international events have been included below. Most competitions were canceled or postponed in 2020 and therefore many top competitors did not compete in any international competitions.

Women

All-around

Vault

Uneven bars

Balance beam

Floor exercise

Men

All-around

Floor exercise

Pommel horse

Rings

Vault

Parallel bars

Horizontal bar

References

Artistic
Artistic gymnastics
Gymnastics by year
2020 sport-related lists